Im Gyeong-seok (born 19 September 1968) is a South Korean rower. He competed in the men's single sculls event at the 1988 Summer Olympics.

References

1968 births
Living people
South Korean male rowers
Olympic rowers of South Korea
Rowers at the 1988 Summer Olympics
Place of birth missing (living people)
Asian Games medalists in rowing
Rowers at the 1990 Asian Games
Asian Games silver medalists for South Korea
Medalists at the 1990 Asian Games